Brian McKee (born December 13, 1964) is a Canadian former ice hockey defenceman who played nine seasons of professional hockey from 1986 to  1995. He was drafted by the Minnesota North Stars in the 1986 NHL Supplemental Draft.

McKee played predominantly in the International Hockey League where he appeared in 362 regular season games with the Indianapolis Checkers, Saginaw Hawks, Flint Spirits, Milwaukee Admirals, Fort Wayne Komets, Peoria Rivermen, Phoenix Roadrunners, and Houston Aeros.

Awards and honours

References

External links

1964 births
Living people
Bowling Green Falcons men's ice hockey players
Canadian ice hockey defencemen
Flint Spirits players
Fort Wayne Komets players
Houston Aeros (1994–2013) players
Indianapolis Checkers players
Milwaukee Admirals (IHL) players
Minnesota North Stars draft picks
Murrayfield Racers players
National Hockey League supplemental draft picks
People from Willowdale, Toronto
Peoria Rivermen (IHL) players
Phoenix Roadrunners (IHL) players
Saginaw Hawks players
Saginaw Wheels players
Sportspeople from North York
Ice hockey people from Toronto
Canadian expatriate ice hockey players in Scotland
Canadian expatriate ice hockey players in the United States